Ngapyaw baung (also transliterated as Ngapyaw paung) is a traditional Burmese dessert or mont.  The dessert is a pudding cooked using fresh bananas stewed in milk, coconut milk and sugar, then sprinkled with sesame seeds or poppy seeds. It is served most often at ceremonies and other special occasions because it is an easy and quick dessert to make.

References

Burmese desserts and snacks
Burmese cuisine
Banana dishes
Puddings
Desserts